Ramal da Figueira da Foz, also known as Ramal de Pampilhosa, and originally as Linha da Beira Alta, together with the section from Pampilhosa to Vilar Formoso, is a closed railway line Portugal. It connected the stations of Figueira da Foz (which is also the terminus of the Linha do Oeste) to the station of Pampilhosa, at the junction of Linha do Norte and Linha da Beira Alta, with a total length 50.4 km. It was opened on 3 August 1882, and closed on 5 January 2009, for safety reasons.

See also 
 List of railway lines in Portugal
 List of Portuguese locomotives and railcars
 History of rail transport in Portugal

References

Sources 
 

Railway lines in Portugal
Iberian gauge railways
Railway lines opened in 1882
Railway lines closed in 1909